Commuting is periodically recurring travel between one's place of residence and place of work or study, where the traveler, referred to as a commuter, leaves the boundary of their home community. By extension, it can sometimes be any regular or often repeated travel between locations, even when not work-related. The modes of travel, time taken and distance traveled in commuting varies widely across the globe. Most people in least-developed countries continue to walk to work. The cheapest method of commuting after walking is usually by bicycle, so this is common in low-income countries, but is also increasingly practised by people in wealthier countries for environmental and health reasons. In middle-income countries, motorcycle commuting is very common.  The next technology adopted as countries develop is more dependent on location: in more populous, older cities, especially in Eurasia mass transit (rail, bus, etc.) predominates, while in smaller, younger cities, and large parts of North America and Australasia, commuting by personal automobile is more common.   A small number of very wealthy people, and those working in remote locations around the world, also commute by air travel, often for a week or more at a time rather than the more typical daily commute.  Transportation links that enable commuting also impact the physical layout of cities and regions, allowing a distinction to arise between mostly-residential suburbs and the more economically focused urban core of a city (process known as suburban sprawl), but the specifics of how that distinction is realized remain drastically different between societies, with Eurasian "suburbs" often being more densely populated than North American "urban cores".

History 

The first separation between workplace and place of residence occurred as a result of the invention of the steam railway.

The word commuter derives from early days of rail travel in US cities, such as New York, Philadelphia, Boston and Chicago, where, in the 1840s, the railways engendered suburbs from which travellers paying a reduced or 'commuted' fare into the city. Later, the back formations "commute" and "commuter" were coined therefrom. Commuted tickets would usually allow the traveller to repeat the same journey as often as they liked during the period of validity: normally, the longer the period the cheaper the cost per day.

Before the 19th century, most workers lived less than an hour's walk from their work. The Industrial Revolution brought specialization of work and workplaces, and relocated most paid work from households and rural areas to factories in urban areas. Today, many people travel daily to work a long way from their own towns, cities, and villages, especially in industrialised societies. Depending on factors such as the high cost of housing in city centres, lack of public transit, and traffic congestion, modes of travel may include automobiles, motorcycles, trains, aircraft, buses, and bicycles. Where Los Angeles is infamous for its automobile gridlock, commuting in New York is closely associated with the subway; in London and Tokyo and several European cities, "commuter" is automatically associated with rail passengers. In the near future there may be another move away from the traditional "commute" with the introduction of flexible working. Some have suggested that many employees would be far more productive and live healthier, stress-free lives if the daily commute is removed completely.

Suburbs 

Commuting has had a large impact on modern life. It has allowed cities to grow to sizes that were previously not practical, and it has led to the proliferation of suburbs. Many large cities or conurbations are surrounded by commuter belts, also known as metropolitan areas, commuter towns, dormitory towns, or bedroom communities.  The prototypical commuter lives in one of these areas and travels daily to work or to school in the core city.

As urban sprawl pushes farther and farther away from central business districts, new businesses can appear in outlying cities, leading to the existence of the reverse commuter who lives in a core city but works in the suburbs, and to a type of secondary commuter who lives in a more distant exurb and works in the outlying city or industrial suburb.

Gender differences
A UK study, published in 2009, found that on average women suffer four times as much psychological stress from their work commute as men do.

Education 
Institutions that have few dormitories or low student housing populations are called commuter schools in the United States.

Traffic 

Most commuters travel at the same time of day, resulting in the morning and evening rush hours, with congestion on roads and public transport systems not designed or maintained well enough to cope with the peak demands. As an example, Interstate 405 located in Southern California is one of the busiest freeways in the United States. Commuters may sit up to two hours in traffic during rush hour. Construction work or collisions on the freeway distract and slow down commuters, contributing to even longer delays.

Pollution 
Cars carrying only one occupant use fuel and roads less efficiently than shared cars or public transport, and increase traffic congestion.  Commuting by car is a major factor contributing to air pollution. Carpool lanes can help commuters reach their destinations more quickly, encourage people to socialize, and spend time together, while reducing air pollution.

Some governments and employers have introduced employee travel reduction programs that encourage such alternatives as carpooling and remote work. Some are also carpooling using Internet sites to save money. Alternatives like personal rapid transit have also been proposed to reap the energy-efficiency benefits of a mass transit system while maintaining the speed and convenience of individual transport.

Traffic emissions, such as from cars and trucks, also contribute. Airborne by-products from vehicle exhaust systems cause air pollution and are a major ingredient in the creation of smog in some large cities.

The major culprits from transportation sources are carbon monoxide (CO), nitrogen oxides (NO and NOx), volatile organic compounds, sulfur dioxide, and hydrocarbons. (Hydrocarbons are the main components of petroleum fuels such as gasoline and diesel fuel.) These molecules react with sunlight, heat, ammonia, moisture, and other compounds to form the noxious vapours, ground level ozone, and particles that comprise smog.

Social trends

Commuting trends in the United States
In the United States, the Census Bureau's American Community Survey (ACS) collects data on commuting times, allowing an analysis of average commute time by industry, location, and vehicle. According to the 2014 ACS, the average commute time for adults in the United States was 26.8 minutes. The occupations with the longest commutes were Construction and Mining (33.4 minutes), Computer Science and Math (31.8), and Business Operations Specialists (30.2), while those in the military had the shortest commute (21). In general, urban and suburban workers in the US have similar commute times (about 30 minutes), while rural workers have significantly shorter commutes (22.6 minutes). In the US, over 90% of workers commute by car, while about 5% commute by public transportation. Statistical models indicate that in addition to demographics and work duration, commute time is one of the most important determinants of discretionary time allocation by individuals.

Commuting College Students 
The number of students who commute to college continues to increase significantly as the years go by. From 1996 to 2006 alone, the percentage of undergraduate students who commuted to campus began to increase at a rate of 30% to 50%.

Commuting and the scarcity of local employment 
Commuting is often made necessary due to local employment market factors which may stem from the decline of manufacturing (i.e., in cities where large manufacturing employers have either closed or laid off workers, with no other employers to absorb that loss) and, in general, the sheer lack of local employment. More specifically, that wages from local employers are seldom the same as what a worker household may require to sustain the household. As a result, the needs of worker households must be sustained and this leads to a wider field of job search beyond a local area to the next nearest city or metropolitan area, resulting in the requirement for commuting. Hence, in areas where little or no transit options exist that can facilitate a journey to work to meet the requirements of a worker schedule, the use of a car is therefore made necessary. This clearly is a personal choice that is borne of financial need, but also acknowledges that the issue of how local economies sustain themselves is the overarching problem which needs to be addressed.

Social and health implications of commuting
Since commuting largely stems from a need to travel outside a home community to sustain a household income while facing a bleak local employment market, this comes with additional social and health implications. First, there is the increased risk of injury and accident while driving as distance and time in the vehicle increases, which is generally observed when operating a vehicle. Fatigue and hazardous road conditions add to this risk. Second, while income from employment is greater in other cities, stress from commuting factors become a factor for personal health. Ironically, stress from having to locate employment or being placed in a low-income situation might lead to a similar outcome. However, this is dichotomous with the satisfaction of a sustainable income and good employment, which is clearly the goal of an individual who is faced with commuting.

See also

 Bicycle commuting
 Commuter bus
 Commuter rail
 Commuter worker
 Environmental impact of transport
 Extreme commuting
 Hypermobility (travel)
 Journey to work
 Light rail
 Marchetti's constant
 Motorcycle commuting
 Park and ride
 Rapid Transit
 Reverse commuting
 Roadway air pollution
 Short Commute Vehicle
 Slugging
 Straphanger
 Student transport
 Transit-oriented development
 Urban planning

References

External links

"Commuters," a poetic rendition of the New Jersey-to-New York commuting life by Steve Peacock (2011) InDigestMag.com
US Commuting Averages (2002)
Some Commuters are travelling from France to London
Platform 11 – Ireland's National Rail Commuter Group
Five Maps That Reveal New Truths About America's Megaregions

 
Transport and the environment
Urban geography
Types of travel